Tsagkarada is a village and a community in the municipal unit of Mouresi in the eastern part of Magnesia, Greece. It was the seat of the former municipality Mouresi. It is situated at 408 m elevation, on the eastern slope of the forested Pelion mountains. Its population in 2011 was 525 for the village and 543 for the community which includes the village Mylopotamos. Tsagkarada is located 1.5 km southeast of Mouresi, 3 km north of Xorychti, 9 km southeast of Zagora and about 20 km east of the city of Volos (Magnesia's capital). At the main square, near Agia Paraskevi church, there is a big platanus. Perhaps the older of Greece. It is said it has at least one thousand years. It has a perimeter of nearly 20 meters.

Population

See also

List of settlements in the Magnesia regional unit

References

External links 

Populated places in Pelion